Ranjitram Vavabhai Mehta (25 October 1881 – 4 June 1917) was a Gujarati language writer from British India.

Biography 
Mehta was born on 25 October 1881 in Surat to Vavabhai. He completed his schooling in Ahmedabad where his father was the Chief Engineer of the Ahmedabad Municipal Committee. He completed Bachelor of Arts from Gujarat College in 1903 and served as a fellow for eight months. From 1906 to 1917, he served as a personal assistant of Prof. Gajjar and Prabhashankar Pattani, Dewan of Bhavnagar State. He had served as principal of high school at Umreth in 1905.

He founded Gujarat Sahitya Sabha in 1904 and Gujarati Sahitya Parishad in 1905. He died on 4 June 1917 by drowning in sea at Juhu beach. The highest award of Gujarati literature and culture, Ranjitram Suvarna Chandrak, is named after him.

His son Asoka Mehta (1911-1984) was an Indian independence activist and socialist politician.

Works 
Mehta worked in different genres of literature such as essay, novel, drama and short story.  Ranjitkruti Sangrah, a collection of his writings, was published posthumously in 1921 by K. M. Munshi. Ranjitramna Nibandho, a collection of his essays, was also published posthumously in 1923. Gujarat Sahitya Parishad published his complete work as Ranjitram Gadyasanchay 1-2 in 1982 on his birth centenary. Gujarati Sahitya Akademi has published Ranjitram Vavavbhai ane Temnu Sahitya. His Ahmad Rupande (1908) was a love story between Hindu girl and Muslim boy. In 1905, he had coined the Gujarati words Lokgeet and Lokkatha for folklore in a paper presented at Gujarati Sahitya Parishad.

See also 

 List of Gujarati-language writers

References

External links
 

Gujarati-language writers
Writers from Gujarat
1881 births
1917 deaths
20th-century Indian essayists
People from Surat
Indian folklorists
Deaths by drowning in India
Writers in British India